The 2019 All-Ireland Senior Camogie Championship – known as the Liberty Insurance Camogie Championship for sponsorship reasons – is the premier inter-county competition of the 2019 camogie season.

The winners receive the O'Duffy Cup. The championship began on 15 June. It was won by Galway, who defeated Kilkenny in the final.

Teams

Eleven county teams compete in the Senior Championship. 19 lower-ranked county teams compete in the Intermediate and Junior Championships.

Format

Group stage

The eleven teams are drawn into two groups of five and six. Each team plays each other team in its group once. Three points are awarded for a win and one for a draw.

Knock-out stage

The two group runners-up and the two third-placed teams play in two quarter-finals.
The two group winners and the two quarter-final winners play in two semi-finals.
The semi-final winners contest the 2019 All-Ireland Senior Camogie Championship Final

Relegation

The two teams that finish last in their group play each other in a relegation playoff; the losers are relegated to the All-Ireland Intermediate Camogie Championship for 2020.

Group stage

Group games took place 15 June – 24 July 2019.

Group 1

Group 2

Relegation playoff

Meath are relegated to the All-Ireland Intermediate Camogie Championship for 2020.

Knock-out stage

Quarter-finals

Semi-finals

Final

References

External links
 Camogie Association

2019 in camogie
2019